His Buddy is a 1919 American short silent Western film directed by George Holt and featuring Hoot Gibson.

Cast
 Pete Morrison
 Hoot Gibson
 Yvette Mitchell

See also
 Hoot Gibson filmography

External links
 

1919 films
1919 short films
American silent short films
1919 Western (genre) films
American black-and-white films
Films directed by George Holt
Silent American Western (genre) films
1910s American films